The Commander-General of the Carabinieri (Comandante generale dell'Arma dei Carabinieri) is the head of the Carabinieri, the Italian Gendarmerie. He is usually chosen by decree of the president of the republic, nominated by the Minister of Defence (Italy) (who is seen as the head of Defense), and with the approval of the Council of Ministers (Italy),

From January 15, 2021, the position was held by Army Corps General Teo Luzi.

Rank Configuration 
The rank configuration of the Commander-General of the Carabinieri, and in general, of Chief of Staffs of the Army, the Navy, and of the Air Force, is governed in Title III, Chapter III, Section III (in Articles 32, 33, and 34) of an order passed on March 15, 2010, or from "The Code of Military Order".Its attributes in operational, training, and technical logistics are regulated in article 164 of this legislative decree, while those concerning recruitment, statuses, progress through ranks and employment, are regulated in article 165. Article 166 contains matters of finances and administration, and internationally in Article 167.

List of commanders

See also
 Carabinieri
 Italian Minister of Defence
 Ministry of the Interior (Italy)
 Chief of the Defence Staff (Italy)
 List of chiefs of the Polizia di Stato

References 

Military specialisms
Carabinieri
Law enforcement in Italy